Eospilarctia yuennanica is a moth of the family Erebidae first described by Franz Daniel in 1943. It is found in China and Vietnam.

The wingspan is 59–66 mm.

Subspecies
Eospilarctia yuennanica yuennanica (China: Sichuan, Yunnan)
Eospilarctia yuennanica fansipana Saldaitis et al., 2012 (Vietnam: Chapa, Mount Fan-si-pan)

Eospilarctia guangdonga was formerly treated as a subspecies of Eospilarctia yuennanica.

Gallery

References

Moths described in 1943
Spilosomina